Mariyah Islamic School is an all-girls school located in Toronto, Canada. It is located at Central Mosque Scarborough.

The school is recognized and accredited by the Ontario Ministry of Education, was first opened in 1995 and is known as the "sister" of Jaamiah Ajax, a boarding school exclusively for boys. The education offered at Mariyah ranges from kindergarten to grade 12.  The school's curriculum consists of both Islamic studies and traditional academic courses.

Educational institutions established in 1995
Elementary schools in Toronto
High schools in Toronto
Islamic schools in Canada
Middle schools in Toronto
Private schools in Toronto
Girls' schools in Canada
Education in Scarborough, Toronto
1995 establishments in Ontario
Islam in Toronto